The National Natural Landmarks (NNLs) in Illinois include 18 of the almost 600 such landmarks in the United States. They cover areas of geological, biological and historical importance, and include lakes, bogs, canyons and forests. Several of the sites provide habitat for rare or endangered plant and animal species. The landmarks are located in 13 of the state's 102 counties. Five counties each contain all or part of two or more NNLs, while one landmark is split between two counties. The first designation, Forest of the Wabash, was made in 1965, while the most recent designation, Markham Prairie, was made in 1987. Owners include private individuals or organizations, and several county, state and federal agencies.

The National Natural Landmarks Program is administered by the National Park Service, a branch of the Department of the Interior. The National Park Service determines which properties meet NNL criteria and, after notifying the owners, makes nomination recommendations. The Secretary of the Interior reviews nominations and, based on a set of predetermined criteria, makes a decision on NNL designation or a determination of eligibility for designation. Both public and privately owned properties can be designated as NNLs. Owners may object to the nomination of the property as a NNL. This designation provides indirect, partial protection of the historic integrity of the properties via tax incentives, grants, monitoring of threats, and other means.

National Natural Landmarks

See also
List of ecoregions in Illinois
Illinois Natural History Survey

References
 General
 

Specific

Illinois
National Natural Landmarks